Satchelliella is a genus of flies belonging to the family Psychodidae.

The species of this genus are found in Europe.

Species:
 Satchelliella ariegica (Vaillant, 1963) 
 Satchelliella arvernica Vaillant, 1979

References

Psychodidae